An aiming station is something used to designate targets for other systems, usually missiles. An example is a tank using a laser or radar to target enemy units for missiles.

Military equipment